Mostyn Dragons F.C. was a Welsh football club based in a small village named Mostyn, Flintshire. They played in the Clwyd League. The club originally started as a junior team, but then later developed a senior side in 2007. They became champions of Clwyd League Division Two and were promoted to division one in 2008-09. The club's home ground is Mostyn Football Pitch, Community Centre, Maes Pennant, Mostyn. In 2014, the club withdrew from the following season and then folded.

History
Mostyn joined the Clwyd Football League in 2007–08 after being a junior side. That season was an admirable one for the team, finishing mid-table and reaching the final of the Halkyn Cup to finish as runners up. In 2008–09, Mostyn were crowned Division Two champions, losing one game all season and having an unbeaten home record.

In 2009–10, despite Mostyn having the 3rd best goal difference in the league, they finished sixth and missed out on promotion by three points. The following season saw managerial changes with Keiron Griffiths taking over from Dave Bell and Ken Pugh early in the season. Further changes came in the final five games of the season, with Karl Bacon taking charge.

The 2011–12 season saw the club move to the new Clwyd East Football League. The season saw the club finish seventh from ten clubs  as well as reaching the finals of the Presidents Cup and Auxiliary Cup.

The 2013–14 season saw changes within the club, with Bacon stepped down from management and becoming club secretary,and club veteran Geraint Rowlands appointed manager. The club finished sixth in the league.

The following season saw the club finish an improved fourth, albeit 25 points away from the league winners, Queens Park. The club withdrew at the end of the season from the league.

Biggest victories and losses
Biggest Clwyd Football League win: 11–0 v Wepre Rangers in 2007.
Biggest Clwyd Football League defeat: 0–9 v Abergele Rovers in 2011.

Honours

League 
 Clwyd League Division Two:
 Winners: 2008–09

Managers
Dave Bell (2007–2011)
Ken Pugh (2011)
Kieron Griffiths (2011)
Karl Bacon (2011–2013)
Geraint Rowlands (2013–?)

References

External links
Club Facebook page

Sport in Flintshire
Football clubs in Wales
Clwyd Football League clubs
Clwyd East Football League clubs